The United States Census Bureau defines the Rochester, Minnesota Metropolitan Statistical Area (MSA) as an area consisting of five counties in southeast Minnesota, anchored by the city of Rochester. As of 2018, the US Census Bureau estimates that the Rochester metropolitan statistical area has a population of 221,587. The Rochester–Austin combined statistical area has a population of 259,813 as of 2018.

Counties
 Dodge
 Fillmore
 Mower (Grand Meadow, Racine)
 Olmsted
 Wabasha

Communities

Cities
 Places with more than 100,000 inhabitants: Rochester.
 Places with 2,500 to 10,000 inhabitants: Byron, Chatfield, Dodge Center, Kasson, Lake City (partial), Pine Island (partial), Plainview, Stewartville, Wabasha.
 Places with 1,000 to 2,500 inhabitants: Blooming Prairie (partial), Eyota, Grand Meadow, Harmony, Hayfield, Mantorville, Oronoco, Preston, Rushford, Spring Valley.
 Places with less than 1,000 inhabitants: Bellechester (partial), Canton, Claremont, Dover, Elgin, Fountain, Hammond, Kellogg, Lanesboro, Mabel, Mazeppa, Millville, Minneiska (partial) Ostrander, Peterson, Racine, Rushford Village, West Concord, Whalan, Wykoff, Zumbro Falls.
 Unincorporated places: Douglas, Simpson, South Troy, Potsdam, Berne, Salem Corners, Chester, Pleasant Grove, Genoa, Post Town, Danesville

Townships
 Townships with more than 2,500 inhabitants: Cascade, Marion, Plainview, Rochester.
 Townships with 1,000 to 2,500 inhabitants:Grand Meadow, Greenfield, Haverhill, High Forest, Kalmar, Mantorville, New Haven, Oronoco, Salem.
 Townships with 500 to 1,000 inhabitants: Canisteo, Concord, Elgin, Gillford, Mazeppa, Milton, Orion, Pleasant Grove, Rock Dell, Vernon, Viola, Wasioja, Zumbro.
 Townships with less than 500 inhabitants: Ashland, Chester, Claremont, Dover, Ellington, Elmira, Eyota, Glasgow, Hayfield, Highland, Hyde Park, Lake, Minneiska, Mount Pleasant, Oakwood, Pepin, Quincy, Racine, Ripley, Watopa, West Albany, Westfield.

Demographics
As of the census of 2000, there were 163,618 people, 62,504 households, and 43,046 families residing within the MSA. The racial makeup of the MSA was 92.01% White, 2.09% African American, 0.25% Native American, 3.34% Asian, 0.03% Pacific Islander, 0.99% from other races, and 1.29% from two or more races. Hispanic or Latino of any race were 2.35% of the population.

The median income for a household in the MSA was $46,957, and the median income for a family was $55,450. Males had a median income of $35,815 versus $26,738 for females. The per capita income for the MSA was $21,287.

Transportation

Highways

Interstate Highways
  Interstate 90

US Highways
  U.S. Highway 14
  U.S. Highway 52
  U.S. Highway 61
  U.S. Highway 63
  U.S. Highway 218 (briefly runs through Dodge County)

Minnesota State Highways
  Minnesota State Highway 16
  Minnesota State Highway 30
  Minnesota State Highway 42
  Minnesota State Highway 43
  Minnesota State Highway 44
  Minnesota State Highway 56
  Minnesota State Highway 57
  Minnesota State Highway 60
  Minnesota State Highway 74
  Minnesota State Highway 80
  Minnesota State Highway 139
  Minnesota State Highway 247
  Minnesota State Highway 250

Public Airports

Commercial
Rochester International Airport

General Aviation
Dodge Center Airport
Fillmore County Airport
Rushford Municipal Airport

Government and Politics

Federal Representation

All of the Rochester metropolitan area falls in Minnesota's 1st Congressional District, represented by Republican Brad Finstad.

State Senate Legislators

The following list shows the Rochester metropolitan area's representation in the Minnesota Senate:

See also
 Minnesota census statistical areas

References

 
Olmsted County, Minnesota
Geography of Dodge County, Minnesota
Wabasha County, Minnesota
Mower County, Minnesota
Fillmore County, Minnesota
Dodge County, Minnesota